Tazian-e Pain (also Romanized as Tāzīān-e Pā’īn; also known as Pārsīān, Tāzeyān, Tazeyān-e Zīr, Tāzīān, Tāzīān-e Zīr, and Tazīyan) is a city in Tazian Rural District, in the Central District of Bandar Abbas County, Hormozgan Province, Iran. At the 2006 census, its population was 5,695, in 1,446 families.

References 

Populated places in Bandar Abbas County
Cities in Hormozgan Province